Rodolfo Flores (16 December 1920 – 28 October 1982) was a Mexican sports shooter. He competed in the 25 metre pistol and the 50 metre pistol events at the 1956 Summer Olympics.

References

External links
 

1920 births
1982 deaths
Mexican male sport shooters
Olympic shooters of Mexico
Shooters at the 1956 Summer Olympics
Place of birth missing